Champotón may refer to:
 Champotón River
 Champotón, Campeche
 Champotón Municipality